William Cartwright (24 June 1884 in Burton upon Trent – ?) was a professional footballer who played for Gainsborough Trinity, Chelsea, Tottenham Hotspur, Swansea City and Gillingham.

Football career
Cartwright began his career at Gainsborough Trinity. He featured in 59 matches and scored four goals between 1906–07, before joining Chelsea. The full back played 44 matches between 1908–12 for the Stamford Bridge club. In 1913 he signed for Tottenham Hotspur and made his debut against Newcastle United on 15 November 1913  and featured in 19 matches in all competitions for the Lilywhites. After leaving White Hart Lane he played for Swansea City and finally Gillingham.

References 

1884 births
Sportspeople from Burton upon Trent
English footballers
English Football League players
Gainsborough Trinity F.C. players
Chelsea F.C. players
Tottenham Hotspur F.C. players
Swansea City A.F.C. players
Gillingham F.C. players
Year of death missing
Association football fullbacks